The Ottawa Gee-Gees are the athletic teams that represent the University of Ottawa in Ottawa, Ontario.

The Gee-Gees won the national football championship, the Vanier Cup, in 1975 and 2000, while also appearing in the game in the 1970, 1980, and 1997 seasons. The Gee-Gees women's rugby team won the national championship in 2017, and the women's soccer team were national champions in 1996 and 2018. The men's cross country team won three national titles, in 1986, 1987, and 1990.

Name
The name is a result of a progressive evolution. Similar to many older institutions, their teams were long referred to by the school's colours as the Garnet and Grey. Eventually, members of the media began to refer to the teams simply as the ‘GGs’, providing a nickname in both English and French for the bilingual school's teams. The nickname stuck and would eventually be combined with a horse racing term (where a gee-gee is the first horse out of the starting gate) to create the current Gee-Gees team name.

Conference affiliations

Varsity teams

Ottawa Gee-Gees teams compete in:

Men's athletic teams
 Basketball
 Cross country
 Football
 Ice hockey
 Swimming
  Track and field (indoor and outdoor)

Women's athletic teams
 Basketball
 Cross country
 Ice hockey
 Soccer
 Rugby
  Swimming
 Track and field (indoor and outdoor)
 Volleyball

Competitive clubs

 Badminton
 Baseball (men's)
 Cheerleading
 Dance
 Equestrian
 Fastball (women's)
 Fencing
 Golf (men's and women's)
 Lacrosse (men's)

 Nordic skiing (men's and women's)
 Ringette (women's)
 Rowing
 Rugby (men's hybrid of varsity and club)
 Soccer (men's)
 Synchronized swimming
 Ultimate Frisbee (men's and women's)
 Volleyball (men)
 Water polo (men's and women's)

Athletic facilities

Gee-Gees football

Men's basketball

2010–2012
In July 2010, the University of Ottawa appointed James Derouin, an alumnus and former player, as their new head coach after the departure of Coach Dave DeAveiro, who left for McGill University. Derouin was an assistant coach for the UBC Thunderbirds for the previous two years and was captain of the Gee-Gees men's basketball team for both the 2000–01 and 2001–02 seasons. In his final year, he also played under DeAveiro.

The 11-win 2010–11 season was successful despite falling just short of an entrance to the Final 8, losing to the McMaster Marauders in the OUA Final 4.

The 2011–12 regular season was more successful than the previous year. The Gee-Gees entered the OUA playoffs with a 13–9 record but were ousted by rival Ryerson Rams by 3 points in the semifinals. The Gee-Gees had a playoff-experienced mix of veteran and young players going into the 2012–13 season.

2012–2014

The Gee-Gees came into the 2012–13 season with the last chance to make a deep run with star Warren Ward and the rest of their graduating players.

Highly ranked nationally all season, the Gee-Gees posted a 15–5 regular-season record and were dead-set on making an appearance in the CIS tournament. The team lost to bitter cross-city rivals Carleton Ravens by 3 points in the OUA Wilson Cup final, still qualifying for the CIS Final 8 Tournament being held in Ottawa. The team lost to the Lakehead Thunderwolves in the national championship semifinals but defeated the Acadia Axemen to earn their first national medal in school history with a bronze.

The 2013–14 season was one of the best in school history with the play of star senior Johnny Berhanemeskel and star transfer Terry Thomas the Gee-Gees were ranked at #2 in the nation almost all season and posted a school-best 20–2 regular-season record with their two losses coming against nation's #1 Carleton. The Gee-Gees went into the OUA playoffs as the second seed and narrowly beat the Ryerson Rams to advance to the final four in Toronto. In the semifinals, Ottawa easily beat McMaster and advanced to the gold medal game against Carleton the following day. In the final, the Gee-Gees edged Carleton by a score of 78–77 to win their first Wilson Cup (basketball) in 21 years. The loss was Carleton's first against Canadian competition in 49 straight games. Sitting on seed 1 for the Final 8 in the W. P. McGee Trophy, the Gee-Gees advanced to the final game, beating the Saskatchewan Huskies and the Victoria Vikes. The second time this season facing Carleton, in the National Championship final game, the Gee-Gees lost this time, 79–67.

Notable alumni

Ali Mahmoud
 St. Patrick's High School (Ottawa)
 University of Ottawa Gee-Gees  (2002, 2003)
 Lebanon National Basketball Program
 Sporting Al Riyadi Beirut (2004–present)
 2006, 2010 FIBA World Championships

Alex McLeod
 University of Ottawa Gee-Gees (2002–2006)
 Over 1,207 career points
 OUA East Rookie Team (2002)
 OUA East All-Star (2004, 2005, 2006)
 Certified Canadian Lawyer

Joshua Gibson-Bascombe
 University of Ottawa Gee-Gees (2005–2010)
 OUA East Rookie of the Year (2005–2006)
 OUA East All-Star (2006, 2007, 2008, 2009)
 NH Ostrava of the Czech Republic
 Team Canada Men's Development Team
 FISU (2007 Thailand, 2009 Serbia)

Warren Ward
 University of Ottawa Gee-Gees (2008–2013)
 OUA East All-Rookie Team (2008-2009)
 OUA East All-Star (2009, 2010, 2012)
 Plays professionally for TBB Trier
 FISU (2011 China)

Terry Thomas
 University of Ottawa Gee-Gees (2013–2014)
 CIS All-Canadian Second Team (2012)
 CIS National Championship All-Tournament Team (2014)
 All OUA East Second Team (2014)
 CIS National Championship All-Tournament Team (2012)
 All-Atlantic Division First Team (2012)
 Atlantic Division All-Rookie Team (2011)
 Played professionally for the Hamburg Towers in Germany and in the NBL

Johnny Berhanemeskel
 Lester B. Pearson Catholic High School (Gloucester, Ontario)
 University of Ottawa Gee-Gees (2010–2015)
 Played professionally for the Ottawa Blackjacks (2020-2021)
 Played for Team Canada Senior Men's National Basketball Team
 CIS Outstanding Player (2015)
 First Team All-Canadian (2015)
 OUA Player of the Year (2015)
 Gee-Gees all-time leading scorer with 2000 points
 Gee-Gees all-time leader in three-point field-goals made (299)
 Gee-Gees all-time leader in playoff scoring (357 points) and playoff three-pointers made (53)
 Embarked on a professional career after graduation

Women's soccer
The Gee-Gees women's soccer program was founded in 1994 by current head coach Steven Johnson. The team went on to become national champions in 1996, in just their third season of play, after which Johnson was recognized as CIAU coach of the year (an honour he would again receive in 2005). The team has also won CIS silver medals in 1997, 2000, 2003, and 2005 and CIS bronze medals in 2001 and 2006. They went on to win the OUA gold in 2014, and CIS bronze following in 2014 along with receiving the Ottawa Sports Award. They won OUA bronze in 2015.

The University of Ottawa women's soccer team became national champions on November 11, 2018, with a 2–1 victory over the Trinity Western Spartans in front of a home crowd. Miranda Smith scored the game-winning goal to bring the university its first national soccer title since 1996. This was their first finals appearance since 2005, led by long-time head coach Steve Johnson. The Gee-Gees finished atop the OUA East with a 14-1-1 record.

Women's rugby 
As head coach since 2013, Jen Boyd has led the University of Ottawa's Women's rugby team with great success, and became the first full-time head coach in women's rugby. The team would feel disappointment finishing third in 2015 and second in 2016. The Gee-Gees Rugby team finally won their first national championship in 2017 after defeating the Laval Rouge et Or by a score of 20–10. The following year the Gee-Gees would fall short, finishing third in the tournament by defeating Laval 20–19, after a perfect 7–0 season to claim the RSEQ championship.

Men's hockey
The men's hockey program was formed in 1889. The team played in the Ottawa City Hockey League. The team was first known as "Garnet and Grey", as well as the other varsity athletic programs within the University of Ottawa. In the 1940s, all the varsity athletic programs became known as the "Gee-Gees", which was nicknamed by the media. The Gee-Gees had tremendous success in the 1980s. Despite, that the Gee-Gees have yet to win the University Cup. Ottawa's most memorable run took place in 2004, as the Gee-Gees ousted their rival UQTR Patriotes 2–1 in the OUA playoffs, and then advanced to the Queen's Cup, hosted by the University of Western Ontario. The Gee-Gees lost the OUA final to York, but they still earned a spot in the University Cup, held in Fredericton, New Brunswick, where the power-house UNB Varsity Reds played host to the tournament. However, the Gee-Gees failed to record a win and went home 0–2. Notably, it was the first time since 1985 that the Gee-Gees played in the University Cup.

The Gee-Gees are well known for their successful coaches like Mickey Goulet, who is the former head coach of the Italian National Men's Hockey Team, which participated in the 2006 Winter Olympics in Torino, Italy. Coaches like Michel Boucher, Tony Zappia, and Dave Leger.

The Gee-Gees played in several rinks before the current Minto Sports Complex, which was built on the site of the Minto Arena, the former Minto Skating Club facility, which was demolished in 2000. Ottawa has held games at the Sandy Hill Arena and the Robert Guertin Arena in Hull. The first rink was known as "College Yard", which was an outdoor rink in front of Tabaret Hall. The second venue for the Gee-Gees was the indoor Rideau Skating Rink, which was flooded during winter for the ice surface. The site on the corner of Waller Street and Laurier Avenue is now the Arts building at the University of Ottawa.

2014–2016 suspension
On March 3, 2014, the University of Ottawa men's varsity hockey team was suspended from any activity due to "severe misconduct". In a press conference, the university stated that they alerted the police due to the severity of the allegations. It was later discovered that some of the players on the hockey team were allegedly involved in a gang sexual assault on the weekend of February 1 while in Thunder Bay playing Lakehead University.

University of Ottawa officials were made aware of the situation by a third party on February 24, 2014. University officials gave information to Thunder Bay police, who confirmed they were in the initial stages of an investigation regarding a sexual assault. The University of Ottawa conducted its own review which called for the initial suspension while the investigation was ongoing. The university also contacted Ottawa police about the allegations, who in turn, cooperated with Thunder Bay police to complete the investigation.

During a press conference on March 3, 2014, the president of the university, Allan Rock, stated that the university was going to announce the suspension of the hockey program on February 28, 2014, but the Thunder Bay Police asked them to delay.

Two former players ultimately faced charges related to the incident. In June 2014, Rock announced uOttawa would not ice a team in 2014–15. January 2015, Rock announced that uOttawa would sit out the 2015–16 season as well in order to give university officials more time to implement reforms. The two former players were found not guilty of sexual assault in a verdict from Ontario Court Justice Chantal M. Brochu on June 25, 2018. The team returned for the 2016–17 season.

Women's hockey

Awards and honors

Athletes of the Year

References

External links
 

 
Quebec Rugby Football Union teams
Ontario Rugby Football Union teams
Sports teams in Ottawa